The International Racquetball Federation's 17th Racquetball World Championships were held in Burlington, Ontario, Canada, from June 14 to 21, 2014. This was the second time Worlds were in Canada. Previously, they were in Montreal in 1992.

The women's doubles defending champions were Mexicans Paola Longoria and Samantha Salas and they won gold for a third straight time. In the final, they defeated American Aimee Ruiz, a former World Champion doubles player, and Janel Tisinger in two straight games. Longoria and Salas beat the Chilean team of Angela Grisar and Carla Muñoz in the semi-finals, which was a rematch of the 2012 final.

In the other semi-final, Ruiz and Tisinger needed to come back after losing the first game against the Ecuador team of Veronica Sotomayor and Maria Paz Muñoz, winning the match in a tie-breaker.

Tournament format
The 2014 World Championships was the first competition with an initial round robin stage that was used to seed players for an elimination qualification round. Previously, players were seeded into an elimination round based on how their countries had done at previous World Championships, and then a second team competition was also played. This year there was no team competition.

Round robin

Pool A

Pool B

Pool C

Pool D

Elimination round
Source

References

2014 Racquetball World Championships